Ginés Meléndez Sotos (born 22 March 1950) is a retired Spanish footballer and football manager.

Football career
Ginés, stopped playing football with 21. He then studied as a coach, and began training the ranks at Albacete Balompié. He was for many years coordinator of Albacete in the youth system, as he combined with that of municipal councilor in Albacete. He was also a physical education teacher at a school in Albacete. In 1992 and 1994 coached a game in La Liga as caretaker manager. After years as coach and trainer of Albacete Balompié, in the 1997–98 season led the first team the last 5 round, getting the salvation of category.

After many years in Albacete Balompié got the call from Iñaki Sáez to join the technical staff of the youth ranks of the Spanish team. He has won numerous international competitions with the U17 and U19.

References

External links
 

1950 births
Living people
Sportspeople from Albacete
Spanish Socialist Workers' Party politicians
Spanish footballers
Footballers from Castilla–La Mancha
Albacete Balompié players
Spanish football managers
La Liga managers
Albacete Balompié managers
Association footballers not categorized by position